Qajarabad (also Romanized as Qajarābād) is a village in Juqin Rural District, in the Central District of Shahriar County, Tehran Province, Iran. At the 2006 census, its population was 1,104, in 301 families.

References 

Populated places in Shahriar County